

Peerage of England

|Earl of Surrey (1088)||John de Warenne, 6th Earl of Surrey||1240||1304||
|-
|rowspan="2"|Earl of Warwick (1088)||William Maudit, 8th Earl of Warwick||1253||1267||Died
|-
|William de Beauchamp, 9th Earl of Warwick||1267||1298||
|-
|Earl of Leicester (1107)||Simon de Montfort, 6th Earl of Leicester||1218||1265||Attainted, and the title became forfeited
|-
|rowspan="2"|Earl of Gloucester (1122)||Richard de Clare, 6th Earl of Gloucester||1230||1262||5th Earl of Hertford; Died
|-
|Gilbert de Clare, 7th Earl of Gloucester||1262||1295||6th Earl of Hertford
|-
|rowspan="2"|Earl of Arundel (1138)||John FitzAlan, 6th Earl of Arundel||1243||1267||Died
|-
|John FitzAlan, 7th Earl of Arundel||1267||1272||
|-
|Earl of Derby (1138)||Robert de Ferrers, 6th Earl of Derby||1254||1266||Title became forfeited
|-
|Earl of Norfolk (1140)||Roger Bigod, 4th Earl of Norfolk||1225||1270||
|-
|rowspan="2"|Earl of Devon (1141)||Baldwin de Redvers, 7th Earl of Devon||1245||1262||Died
|-
|Isabella de Fortibus, Countess of Devon||1262||1293||
|-
|rowspan="2"|Earl of Oxford (1142)||Hugh de Vere, 4th Earl of Oxford||1221||1263||Died
|-
|Robert de Vere, 5th Earl of Oxford||1263||1297||
|-
|rowspan="2"|Earl of Salisbury (1145)||Ela of Salisbury, 3rd Countess of Salisbury||1196||1261||Died
|-
|Margaret de Lacy, 4th Countess of Salisbury||1261||1310||
|-
|Earl of Hereford (1199)||Humphrey de Bohun, 2nd Earl of Hereford||1220||1275||1st Earl of Essex (1239)
|-
|Earl of Winchester (1207)||Roger de Quincy, 2nd Earl of Winchester||1219||1264||Died, title became extinct
|-
|rowspan="2"|Earl of Lincoln (1217)||Margaret de Quincy, Countess of Lincoln||1232||1266||Died
|-
|Henry de Lacy, 3rd Earl of Lincoln||1266||1311||
|-
|Earl of Cornwall (1225)||Richard, 1st Earl of Cornwall||1225||1272||
|-
|Earl of Richmond (1241)||Peter of Savoy, 1st Earl of Richmond||1241||1268||
|-
|Earl of Pembroke (1247)||William de Valence, 1st Earl of Pembroke||1247||1296||
|-
|Earl of Chester (1253)||Edward, Earl of Chester||1253||1272||
|-
|Earl of Leicester (1265)||Edmund Plantagenet, 1st Earl of Leicester||1267||1296||New creation; 1st Earl of Lancaster (1267)
|-
|rowspan="2"|Earl of Richmond (1268)||John I, Duke of Brittany||1268||1268||New creation; surrendered the title to his son
|-
|John II, Duke of Brittany||1268||1305||
|-
|Baron de Ros (1264)||Robert de Ros||1264||1285||New creation
|-
|rowspan="2"|Baron le Despencer (1264)||Hugh le Despencer, 1st Baron le Despencer||1264||1265||New creation; Died
|-
|Hugh le Despencer, 2nd Baron le Despencer||1265||1326||
|-
|rowspan="2"|Baron Basset of Drayton (1264)||Ralph Basset, 1st Baron Basset of Drayton||1264||1264||New creation; Died
|-
||Ralph Basset, 2nd Baron Basset of Drayton||1265||1299||
|-
|Baron Basset of Sapcote (1264)||Ralph Basset, 1st Baron Basset of Sapcote||1264||1282||New creation
|-
|Baron Marmion (1264)||William Marmion||1264||1265||New creation for leading rebel. Not recalled after the Battle of Evesham.
|-

Peerage of Scotland

|Earl of Mar (1114)||Uilleam, Earl of Mar||Abt. 1240||1281||
|-
|Earl of Dunbar (1115)||Patrick III, Earl of Dunbar||1248||1289||
|-
|Earl of Angus (1115)||Gilbert de Umfraville, Earl of Angus||1246||1307||
|-
|rowspan=2|Earl of Atholl (1115)||Ada, Countess of Atholl||Abt. 1250||1264||Died
|-
|David I Strathbogie, Earl of Atholl||1264||1270||
|-
|Earl of Buchan (1115)||Alexander Comyn, Earl of Buchan||Abt. 1243||1289||
|-
|Earl of Strathearn (1115)||Maol Íosa II, Earl of Strathearn||1245||1271||
|-
|rowspan=2|Earl of Fife (1129)||Máel Coluim II, Earl of Fife||1228||1266||Died
|-
|Colbán, Earl of Fife||1266||1270||
|-
|Earl of Menteith (1160)||Mary I, Countess of Menteith||1258||1295||
|-
|rowspan=2|Earl of Lennox (1184)||Maol Domhnaich, Earl of Lennox||1220||1260||Died
|-
|Maol Choluim I, Earl of Lennox||1260||1291||
|-
|Earl of Carrick (1184)||Marjorie, Countess of Carrick||1256||1292||
|-
|Earl of Ross (1215)||Uilleam I, Earl of Ross||1251||1274||
|-
|Earl of Sutherland (1235)||William de Moravia, 2nd Earl of Sutherland||1248||1307||
|-
|}

Peerage of Ireland

|Earl of Ulster (1264)||Walter de Burgh, 1st Earl of Ulster||1264||1271||New creation
|-
|rowspan=2|Baron Athenry (1172)||Meyler de Bermingham||1244||1262||Died
|-
|Peter de Bermingham||1262||1307||
|-
|rowspan=2|Baron Kingsale (1223)||Patrick de Courcy, 2nd Baron Kingsale||1230||1260||Died
|-
|Nicholas de Courcy, 3rd Baron Kingsale||1260||1290||
|-
|rowspan=2|Baron Kerry (1223)||Thomas Fitzmaurice, 1st Baron Kerry||1223||1260||Died
|-
|Maurice Fitzthomas Fitzmaurice, 2nd Baron Kerry||1260||1303||
|-
|Baron Barry (1261)||David de Barry, 1st Baron Barry||1261||1278||New creation
|-
|}

References

Further reading
 

Lists of peers by decade
1260s in England
1260s in Ireland
13th century in Scotland
13th-century English people
13th-century Irish people
13th-century mormaers
Peers